The 2015 Nigerian Senate election in Taraba State was held on March 28, 2015, to elect members of the Nigerian Senate to represent Taraba State. Emmanuel Bwacha representing Taraba South and Abubakar Sani representing Taraba North won on the platform of Peoples Democratic Party, while Yusuf Abubakar Yusuf representing Taraba Central won on the platform of All Progressives Congress.

Overview

Summary

Results

Taraba South 
Peoples Democratic Party candidate Emmanuel Bwacha won the election, defeating All Progressives Congress candidate Waziri Salihu and other party candidates.

Taraba North 
Peoples Democratic Party candidate Abubakar Sani won the election, defeating All Progressives Congress candidate Ali Sani and other party candidates.

Taraba Central 
All Progressives Congress candidate Yusuf Abubakar Yusuf won the election, defeating Peoples Democratic Party candidate Marafa Bashir and other party candidates.

References 

Taraba State Senate elections
March 2015 events in Nigeria
Tar